Potamanthus yooni is a species of mayfly native to Korea. Taking the species out of the country is prohibited by the South Korean Government.

References

Mayflies
Insects of Korea
Insects described in 1991